Stefano Cobolli (born 2 March 1977) is an Italian former professional tennis player.

A right-handed player from La Spezia, Cobolli turned professional in 1995 and reached a career high ranking on the professional tour of 236 in the world. 

His best performance on the ATP Tour came when he qualified for the main draw of the 1998 Croatia Open Umag and made the second round, where he took Magnus Norman to three sets.

Cobolli now coaches at the Rome Tennis Academy.

References

External links
 
 

1977 births
Living people
Italian male tennis players
People from La Spezia
Sportspeople from the Province of La Spezia